Acapu is a common name of Tupi origin for several timber-producing South American trees and may refer to:

Andira
Clathrotropsis nitida
Vouacapoua americana, found in Brazil, French Guiana, Guyana, and Suriname